Taft City School District is a school district headquartered in Taft, California. It was established in 1909.

 the superintendent is Julie Graves.

Schools
 Junior high school Lincoln Junior High School
 Elementary schools
 Conley Elementary School
 Jefferson Elementary School
 Parkview Elementary School
 Roosevelt Elementary School
 Taft Primary Elementary School

See also
 Taft Union High School - operated separately
 Taft College - Community college

References

External links
 
School districts in Kern County, California
1909 establishments in California
School districts established in 1909